Pei Yuwen (born 4 July 1985) is a Chinese footballer of Korean descent who currently plays for China League Two side Yanbian Longding.

Club career
Pei Yuwen was born in Longjing, Yanbian. He started his professional football career in 2005 when he was promoted to Yanbian FC's first squad.  On 5 January 2013, Pei transferred to fellow China League One side Shenyang Zhongze on a free transfer.  Pei returned to Yanbian FC in February 2015. He played 26 league matches in the 2015 season as Yanbian won promotion to the Chinese Super League. On 5 March 2016, Pei made his Super League debut in the first match of 2016 season against Shanghai Shenhua.

Career statistics
Statistics accurate as of match played 31 December 2020.

Honours

Club
Yanbian FC
China League One: 2015

References

External links
 

1985 births
Living people
Chinese footballers
People from Yanbian
Yanbian Funde F.C. players
Chinese Super League players
China League One players
Chinese people of Korean descent
Association football defenders
Association football midfielders